The Adorable Savage is a 1920 American silent adventure drama film directed by Norman Dawn and written by Doris Schroeder. It is based on the 1913 adventure novel Marama: A Tale of the South Pacific by Ralph Stock. The film stars Edith Roberts, Jack Perrin, Richard Cummings, Noble Johnson, Arthur Jervis, and Lucille Moulton. The film was released on August 6, 1920, by Universal Film Manufacturing Company.

Plot
Marama Thurston leaves her fashionable boarding school in America when her ailing father Jim Thurston, a plantation owner on Fiji, begs her to protect the rubber crop from his thieving son-in-law. Upon arriving on the island, Marama learns that she is a half-caste. Traumatized, she assumes native customs and agrees to marry Ratu Madri, the island's ruler. Templeton, an American fugitive living on Fiji, falls in love with her, but Marama rejects him, having pledged herself already to the Fiji chief. As Marama dances the prenuptial rite, Templeton attempts to rescue her. The natives seize the American, and Marama threatens suicide if they harm him. The couple escape during a hurricane, and soon after a yacht arrives with the news that Templeton has been exonerated of murder charges. Their problems thus resolved, they return to America to wed.

Cast         
Edith Roberts as Marama Thurston
Jack Perrin as Templeton
Richard Cummings as Jim Thurston 
Noble Johnson as Ratu Madri
Arthur Jervis as Frank Maddon 
Lucille Moulton as Moala
Lily Phillips as Akanesi

References

External links

Ralph Stock (1913), Marama: A Tale of the South Pacific, Boston: Little, Brown and Co.

1920s English-language films
Silent American drama films
1920 drama films
Universal Pictures films
Films directed by Norman Dawn
American silent feature films
American black-and-white films
1920s American films
Silent adventure drama films